The women's javelin throw at the 2010 African Championships in Athletics was held on July 31.

Results

External links
Results

Javelin
Javelin throw at the African Championships in Athletics
2010 in women's athletics